Knockout is a 2020 Hong Kong–Chinese sports drama film directed, co-produced and co-written by Roy Chow, and featured an ensemble cast include Han Geng, Vivian Wu, Cai Shuling, with a special appearance of Janine Chang and Philip Keung. It tells the story about a former boxing champion returns to the boxing ring after his release from prison to fulfill a promise to his daughter.

Principal photography for the film began on 11 November 2018, completed on 16 January 2020, and mainly took place in Wuxi, Shanghai and Tokyo. The film was released in China on 20 April 2020 through iQIYI streaming platform, due to the COVID-19 pandemic, and received largely positive reviews from critics and audiences.

Plot 
Zhou Shi has the whole world at his fingertips. He is undefeated in the boxing ring and the love of his life is about to give birth to their first child. But after an accident in the ring, that leaves his opponent in a coma, an incident of revenge leads to Zhou Shi being jailed for six years for assault. 

On release, he returns to Shanghai, hoping to restart his life. But he is given tragic news. His wife has died in an accident, and he is now the sole guardian of Blithe, a daughter he has never met. He struggles to get his life back on track while bonding with his daughter, when Ms. Fang, his mother-in-law, unexpectedly enters the frame, threatening to take custody of his daughter. But it gets worse for Zhou Shi, and he needs to find the strength and courage within himself to take on the biggest fight of his life.

Cast 
 Han Geng as Zhou Shi
 Vivian Wu as Ms. Fang
 Cai Shuling as Blithe
 Janine Chang as adult Blithe
 Philip Keung as Kinson Long

References

External links 

2020 films
2020s Mandarin-language films
Chinese sports drama films
Hong Kong sports drama films
Films shot in Wuxi
Films shot in Shanghai
Films shot in Tokyo
Films set in Shanghai
Films set in Tokyo
Films directed by Roy Chow